The Warren Tavern is reportedly one of the oldest taverns in the state of Massachusetts and one of the most historic watering holes in America.  The Warren Tavern was founded in 1780 in Charlestown, Massachusetts and still stands in that block of land today.  In the early years of the Warren Tavern it was frequented by many American Revolutionary War heroes such as Paul Revere, Benjamin Franklin, Sergeant David Turner and George Washington.

History
The Tavern was named after Dr. Joseph Warren, one of the revolutionary leaders killed at the Battle of Bunker Hill. The Warren Tavern, whose main business has always been a tavern, has only been closed for short periods of time since 1780.

Current operation
Today, the Warren Tavern is a staple for local Charlestown residents as well as a popular location for tourists who want to understand American Colonial history and culture. It is located at the intersection of Pleasant Street and Main Street in Charlestown Massachusetts across the Charles River from downtown Boston.

In popular culture
The Boston private eye Spenser has dinner at the Warren Tavern in the 1982 Robert B. Parker novel Ceremony.

References

External links
 Official website

Charlestown, Boston
Drinking establishments in Charlestown, Boston
Restaurants in Boston
Taverns in the American Revolution